Botanical gardens in New Zealand have collections consisting entirely of New Zealand native and endemic species; most have a collection that include plants from around the world. There are botanical gardens and arboreta in all states and territories of New Zealand, most are administered by local governments, some are privately owned.
 Auckland Botanic Gardens
 Bason Botanic Gardens, Whanganui
 Botanical Gardens, Napier
 Christchurch Botanic Gardens
 Dunedin Botanic Gardens
 Hamilton Gardens
 Gisborne Botanical Gardens
 Oamaru Botanic Gardens, Oamaru
 Otari-Wilton's Bush, Wellington
 Queenstown Gardens
 Timaru Botanic Gardens, Timaru
 Wellington Botanic Gardens

References 

New Zealand
Botanical gardens